Adam Henryk Małysz (born 3 December 1977) is a Polish former ski jumper and rally driver. He competed in ski jumping from 1995 to 2011 and is one of the most successful athletes in the history of the sport. His many accomplishments include four World Cup titles (a male record shared with Matti Nykänen), four individual Winter Olympic medals, four individual World Championship gold medals (an all-time record), 39 individual World Cup competition wins, 96 World Cup podiums (individual and team), and being the first male ski jumper to win three consecutive World Cup titles. He is also a winner of the Four Hills Tournament, the only three-time winner of the Nordic Tournament, and a former ski flying world record holder.

After retiring from ski jumping, Małysz competed in the Dakar Rally in 2012, 2013 and 2014 finishing 37th, 15th and 13th respectively. 

In 2018-2022 period he was a director-coordinator of ski jumping and Nordic combined at the Polish Ski Federation. On June 25, 2022, he was elected CEO of Polish Ski Federation

Ski jumping career
Małysz began his senior-level ski jumping career on 4 January 1995, finishing seventeenth at the third event of the Four Hills Tournament in Innsbruck. In his first two World Cup seasons, he was moderately successful, winning in Oslo on 17 March 1996; in Sapporo on 18 January 1997; and in Hakuba on 26 January. His breakthrough season came in 2000–01, when he won the Four Hills Tournament and ended Martin Schmitt's long run of success dating back to 1998–99. Małysz went on to dominate the season by reeling off five consecutive individual victories in Innsbruck, Bischofshofen, both ski flying competitions in Harrachov, and Park City. Further success came at the 2001 World Championships, in which he won a gold medal on the individual normal hill and silver on the individual large hill. He finished the season by a landslide points margin with three more consecutive wins in Falun, Trondheim and Oslo to claim his first Nordic Tournament title.

The 2001–02 season saw Małysz pick up where he left off, as he never once lost the lead in the World Cup standings. A streak of five wins by a highly motivated Sven Hannawald in December 2001 through January 2002 looked to threaten Małysz's run, but burnout prematurely ended Hannawald's challenge. Małysz picked up one last win of the season in Zakopane to the delight of his Polish fans, thereafter finishing consistently on the podium to claim his second World Cup title by a comfortable points margin. He also won silver on the individual large hill and bronze on the individual normal hill at the 2002 Winter Olympics in Park City.

Małysz faced stiff competition in defence of his World Cup title throughout the 2002–03 season. Despite second place at the season-opener in Kuusamo, he failed to win a competition for nearly four months. The lead of the overall standings changed hands several times until the final month of the season, by which time Małysz began to regain his form. At the 2003 World Championships in Predazzo, he won the gold medal in both the individual normal and large hill competitions. This was followed up by three straight wins in Oslo and Lahti (twice in the latter), securing his second Nordic Tournament title.

In the following years, as is the case with almost all ski jumpers in the prime of their career, Małysz was unable to maintain his previous form. He only managed twelfth in the 2003–04 season, finishing on the podium four times but without a win. 2004–05 saw an improvement with fourth place in the overall standings as well as four wins; these came on the large hill in Harrachov, the ski flying hill in Kulm, and a double win in Zakopane. The only highlights of Małysz's 2005–06 campaign, in which he finished ninth overall, were third place in Kuopio and a win in Oslo.

Małysz experienced a significant career resurgence in 2006–07, which began with a surprise win in Oberstdorf in January 2007. This was followed up by a double victory in Titisee-Neustadt, an individual gold medal on the normal hill at the 2007 World Championships, and a hat-trick of wins during the Nordic Tournament (Lahti, Kuopio, and Oslo) to win his third and final such title. The season was punctuated with a clean sweep of all three competitions in Planica, which enabled him to leapfrog his younger competitor Anders Jacobsen with only two competitions remaining. This secured Małysz a fourth World Cup title, equalling Matti Nykänen's record total in the 1980s.

Sporadic success from 2008 to 2011 saw Małysz achieve seventeen podiums, as well as silver medals in both the individual normal hill and large hill competitions at the 2010 Winter Olympics in Vancouver. A fitting end to Małysz's career came in the form of a home victory in Zakopane on 21 January 2011 and third place at the season finale in Planica on 20 March. Małysz publicly announced his retirement from ski jumping six days later.

Legacy and awards
Małysz's success contributed to his enormous popularity not only among ski jumping fans but throughout Poland as well. Additionally, he is the only five-time winner of the ski jumping event at the Holmenkollen Ski Festival (in 1996, 2001, 2003, 2006 and 2007), earning the Holmenkollen Medal in 2001 for his ski jumping victories (shared with Bente Skari and Thomas Alsgaard). He was also voted four times the Polish sportsman of the year (2001, 2002, 2003, 2007).

For his sporting achievements, he received the Order of Polonia Restituta:

 Officer's Cross (4th Class), 2002
 Commander's Cross (3rd Class), 2007
 Commander's Cross with Star (2nd Class), 2010

World Cup

Season titles

Victories

Total podiums

 Iron Mountain  – 18 February 1996 (2nd place)
 Lahti  – 1 March 1996 (3rd place shared with Primož Peterka)
 Falun  – 13 March 1996 (2nd place)
 Oslo/Holmenkollen  – 17 March 1996 (1st place)
 Bischofshofen  – 6 January 1997 (2nd place)
 Engelberg  – 11 January 1997 (3rd place)
 Sapporo  – 18 January 1997 (1st place)
 Hakuba  – 26 January 1997 (1st place)
 Garmisch-Partenkirchen  – 1 January 2001 (3rd place)
 Innsbruck  – 4 January 2001 (1st place)
 Bischofshofen  – 6 January 2001 (1st place)
 Harrachov (HS 205) – 13 January 2001 (1st place)
 Harrachov (HS 205) – 14 January 2001 (1st place)
 Salt Lake City  – 20 January 2001 (1st place)
 Sapporo  – 27 January 2001(1st place)
 Sapporo  – 28 January 2001 (1st place)
 Willingen  – 3 February 2001 (2nd place)
 Willingen  – 4 February 2001 (1st place)
 Oberstdorf (HS 213) – 4 March 2001 (2nd place)
 Falun  – 7 March 2001 (1st place)
 Trondheim/Granasen  – 9 March 2001 (1st place)
 Oslo/Holmenkollen  – 11 March 2001 (1st place)
 Kuopio  – 23 November 2001 (1st place)
 Kuopio  – 24 November 2001 (2nd place)
 Titisee-Neustadt  – 1 December 2001 (1st place)
 Titisee-Neustadt  – 2 December 2001 (2nd place)
 Villach  – 8 December 2001 (1st place)
 Engelberg  – 16 December 2001 (1st place)
 Val di Fiemme/Predazzo  – 21 December 2001 (1st place)
 Val di Fiemme/Predazzo  – 22 December 2001 (1st place)
 Garmisch-Partenkirchen  – 1 January 2002 (3rd place)
 Innsbruck  – 4 January 2002 (2nd place)
 Zakopane  – 20 January 2002 (1st place)
 Lahti  – 1 March 2002 (2nd place)
 Trondheim  – 15 March 2002 (2nd place)
 Oslo/Holmenkollen  – 17 March 2002 (3rd place)
 Kuusamo  – 29 November 2002 (2nd place)
 Titisee-Neustadt  – 14 December 2002 (3rd place)
 Garmisch-Partenkirchen  – 1 January 2003 (2nd place shared with Andreas Goldberger)
 Zakopane  – 18 January 2003 (3rd place)
 Zakopane  – 19 January 2003 (3rd place)
 Tauplitz/Bad Mitterndorf  – 1 February 2003 (3rd place)
 Oslo/Holmenkollen  – 9 March 2003 (1st place)
 Lahti  – 14 March 2003 (1st place)
 Lahti  – 15 March 2003 (1st place)
 Planica (letalnica, HS215) – 22 March 2003 (2nd place)
 Kuusamo  – 28 November 2003 (2nd place)
 Kuusamo  – 30 November 2003 (2nd place)
 Zakopane  – 17 January 2004(2nd place)
 Zakopane  – 18 January 2004 (2nd place)
 Harrachov (HS 142) – 11 December 2004 (1st place)
 Oberstdorf (HS 137) – 29 December 2004 (3rd place)
 Innsbruck  – 3 January 2005 (2nd place)
 Tauplitz/Bad Mitterndorf  – 15 January 2005 (3rd place)
 Tauplitz/Bad Mitterndorf  – 16 January 2005 (1st place)
 Titisee-Neustadt  – 23 January 2005 (2nd place)
 Zakopane  – 29 January 2005 (1st place shared with Roar Ljøkelsøy)
 Zakopane  – 30 January 2005 (1st place)
 Kuopio  – 9 March 2005 (3rd place shared with Jakub Janda)
 Kuopio  – 7 March 2006 (3rd place)
 Oslo/Holmenkollen  – 12 March 2006 (1st place)
 Lillehammer – 3 December 2006 (3rd place)
 Engelberg  – 16 December 2006 (3rd place)
 Oberstdorf (HS 137) – 30 December 2006 (3rd place)
 Oberstdorf (HS 137) – 27 January 2007 (1st place)
 Titisee-Neustadt (HS 142) – 3 February 2007 (1st place)
 Titisee-Neustadt (HS 142) – 4 February 2007 (1st place)
 Klingenthal – 7 February 2007 (3rd place)
 Lahti (HS 130) – 11 March 2007 (1st place)
 Kuopio (HS 127) – 13 March 2007 (1st place)
 Oslo/Holmenkollen (HS 128) – 17 March 2007 (1st place)
 Planica (letalnica, HS215) – 23 March 2007 (1st place)
 Planica (letalnica, HS215) – 24 March 2007 (1st place)
 Planica (letalnica, HS215) – 25 March 2007 (1st place)
 Kuopio/Puijo – 10 March 2009 (3rd place)
 Planica (letalnica, HS215) – 20 March 2009 (2nd place)
 Planica (letalnica, HS215) – 22 March 2009 (2nd place)
 Lillehammer – 5 December 2009 (3rd place)
 Klingenthal – 3 February 2010 (2nd place)
 Lahti (HS 130) – 7 March 2010 (2nd place)
 Kuopio (HS 127) – 9 March 2010 (2nd place)
 Lillehammer – 12 March 2010 (3rd place)
 Oslo/Holmenkollen  – 14 March 2010 (2nd place)
 Engelberg  – 18 December 2010 (2nd place)
 Engelberg  – 19 December 2010 (3rd place)
 Garmisch-Partenkirchen  – 1 January 2011 (3rd place)
 Innsbruck – 3 January 2011 (2nd place)
 Harrachov (HS 205) – 8 January 2011 (3rd place)
 Sapporo  – 15 January 2011 (3rd place)
 Zakopane  – 21 January 2011 (1st place)
 Vikersund – 13 February 2011 (3rd place)
 Planica (letalnica, HS215) – 20 March 2011 (3rd place)

Personal life
Adam Małysz was born in Wisła, Poland, to Ewa and Jan Małysz. He has an older sister – Iwona (born 1975). He graduated from a vocational high school in Ustroń, where he learned a profession (specialisation: tinsmith-roofer). He speaks German very well. On 16 June 1997, he married Izabella Polok (born 4 December 1978). The wedding took place at the Evangelical Church of St. Peter and Paul in the Wisła (Izabella is Catholic). On 31 October 1997, Izabella gave birth to their daughter – Karolina. His life motto is "Be good and that's it" and his idol is a German former ski jumper Jens Weißflog. His religion is Lutheranism.

On 1 April 2007 Małysz opened a Trophy Gallery, which includes all the major medals and trophies he won during his career, including the Crystal Globe trophies for victories in the World Cup. The Gallery is located in the building of the Izabella and Adam Małysz Foundation in Wisła, Poland.

See also
 Sport in Poland
 Poland at the Winter Olympics
 List of Poles

References

External links

 
 
 
 
 
  
  

1977 births
Living people
Polish male ski jumpers
Holmenkollen medalists
Holmenkollen Ski Festival winners
Olympic ski jumpers of Poland
Olympic silver medalists for Poland
Olympic bronze medalists for Poland
Ski jumpers at the 1998 Winter Olympics
Ski jumpers at the 2002 Winter Olympics
Ski jumpers at the 2006 Winter Olympics
Ski jumpers at the 2010 Winter Olympics
Polish Lutherans
People from Wisła
Polish Gorals
Commanders with Star of the Order of Polonia Restituta
Olympic medalists in ski jumping
FIS Nordic World Ski Championships medalists in ski jumping
Medalists at the 2010 Winter Olympics
Medalists at the 2002 Winter Olympics
Sportspeople from Silesian Voivodeship
World record setters in ski flying